Alek Popov is a Bulgarian novelist, short story writer, essayist and scriptwriter, author of the novel Mission London.

Alek Popov was born in Sofia in 1966. He studied in the elite classical gymnasium in Sofia and later received M.A. in Bulgarian philology from the University of Sofia. He is an author of two novels. His first novel, Mission London, was translated to 12 languages and later the film based on the book was a great success and had a box office record high in Bulgaria, outperforming Avatar. His short stories have been translated into 11 languages, including English, German, and French. The English translation of Popov's "Mission London" was published by Istros Books, London in 2014.

References

External links 
 Personal website
 

Bulgarian writers
Living people
Corresponding Members of the Bulgarian Academy of Sciences
Year of birth missing (living people)